Popești is a commune in Argeș County, Muntenia, Romania. It is composed of four villages: Palanga, Popești, Purcăreni and Slobozia. It also included Adunați, Bucov and Râca villages until 2003, when these were split off to form Râca Commune.

References

Communes in Argeș County
Localities in Muntenia